The Socialist Workers Party (POS), initially known as the Workers Party of Cuba, was a political party in Cuba. The party published La Voz Obrera. It was founded by a group of workers in Havana in 1904. In the party was joined by Carlos Baliños, who had formed the Socialist Propaganda Club 1903. Baliños became the leading figure of the party, and the name was changed to POS. The party also adopted a socialist programme. In November 1906 POS merged with the International Socialist Group, forming the Socialist Party of the Island of Cuba. La Voz Obrera was taken over by the new party as its organ.

References

Defunct political parties in Cuba
Political parties established in 1904
Socialist parties in Cuba
1904 establishments in Cuba
Political parties disestablished in 1906